Crithidia pragensis is a species of monoxenous trypanosomatid. It is known to parasitise Brachycera flies, and was first found in the Czech Republic.

References

Further reading
Kostygov, Alexei Yu, et al. "Molecular revision of the genus Wallaceina."Protist 165.5 (2014): 594–604.

External links

Parasitic excavates
Trypanosomatida
Parasites of Diptera